The Askeer Awards are presented annually by the A'Askeer Foundation to recognise excellence in professional theatre in Bulgaria. They are the oldest theatre awards in Bulgaria, and are given to actors, directors, composers and poets for their contributions to Bulgarian stage arts.

Initially created as a parody of the Academy Awards in 1991, the Askeer Awards are among the most significant events honoring theatre in Bulgaria. The awards are given across a range of categories covering directing, acting, production, music, design and costumes. A discretionary non-competitive Honorary Askeer is also given non-annually.

History
In 1991, a group of Bulgarian actors decided to create a theatre parody version of the Academy Awards. They named the awards "Askeer" as an allusion to the "Oscars", and the first statuettes were made of paper. The same year, the first award ceremony was held at the National Palace of Culture in Sofia with winners awarded in eight categories. The following year, the number of categories expanded from 8 to 11. In 1994, theatres from all over Bulgaria were eligible to be nominated for the first time, as opposed to only those located in Sofia.

In 2007, the Foundation established the Honorary Askeer category, awarded for creative honor and contribution to the development of theatre art. The distinction is not awarded annually, but on special occasions. The Bulgarian National Television has aired the award ceremony since 2017.

Nomination
The nominees and winners in all categories are determined by the members of the A'Askeer Foundation. Artists and performances from the Bulgarian Army Theater are not subject to nominations and awards. The weight of each voter's vote in the nominations stage is determined by the number of performances they have seen, an the voting is anonymous.

Categories

Competitive categories
As of 2022, winners are chosen from the following 12 categories:

Special categories
 Honorary Askeer: since 2007

References

External links
 
 Archive of all winners

1991 establishments in Bulgaria
Awards established in 1991